Clee St. Margaret is a civil parish in Shropshire, England.  It contains eight listed buildings that are recorded in the National Heritage List for England.  Of these, one is listed at Grade II*, the middle of the three grades, and the others are at Grade II, the lowest grade.  The parish contains the village of Clee St. Margaret and the surrounding countryside.  Six of the listed buildings are in the village, and consist of a church and a memorial in the churchyard, a farmhouse and a farm building, a complex of mill buildings, and a telephone kiosk.  The other two listed buildings are to the southwest at Cold Weston, and consist of a redundant church and a memorial in its churchyard.


Key

Buildings

References

Citations

Sources

Lists of buildings and structures in Shropshire